Triangle and Robert is a webcomic by Patrick Shaughnessy that ran from August 1999 to September 2007. It is about the adventures of two polygons, an equilateral triangle named 'Triangle', and a rhombus named 'Robert'.

As Patrick Shaughnessy, appearing in the strip as 'the Cartoonist', has explained on many occasions, he can't draw, and he makes up the story as he goes along. All of the characters are simple shapes that he creates using a cheap paint program. More complicated objects are represented by simpler stand-ins (a sheep, for instance, appears as a rectangular placeholder marked "Insert Sheep") or not represented at all. The appeal of the strip seems to lie chiefly in its sophisticated humor, which is rife with popular culture references and self-reference.

Triangle and Robert takes place in a world in which the dominant species is a race of polygons. This world has a rich archaeological history, with evidence of other past dominant races, including humans. The world is located in a universe whose basic physical structure is one of pudding, and "cuisine magic" plays an important role. The chief keepers of cuisine magic are the 'sentries', one for each major food group.

The main plot centers on a struggle over which species will continue to dominate Triangle and Robert's world. The adventures depicted take place during a prophesied 'Time of the Oval", an epochal turning point during which control of the planet is likely to shift. Species that seem to be in the running for dominance include polygons, sheep, possibly humans, pharmaceuticals, and monosodium glutamate.

A major theme of Triangle and Robert involves the cartoonist and his relation to his creations. This is sometimes manifest as bickering between characters in the strip and the cartoonist over his writing and drawing skills. More significantly, there are allusions to unrest in the world of polygons over how poorly they are drawn. Demonstrations are sometimes held in an effort to get rid of the cartoonist and return to a world free from his artistic limitations. On one occasion, Triangle confronted this issue of creator vs. creation by beginning his own comic strip, "Dot and Other Dot", but the characters soon escaped his control, and began their own comic, "Cartoonist Guy" – who, in turn, created his own strip, "The Beforings", which may or may not have led to the Beforings creating the universe of pudding in which Triangle and Robert currently live. This ontological dispute was eventually abandoned when Triangle and Robert were called away on another wacky adventure.

Characters
 Triangle (an equilateral triangle) – The protagonist, and the 'chosen one' of the Time of the Oval. With Robert, he runs a 'Wacky Scheme Consultant' business.
 Robert (a rhombus) – Triangle's sidekick, and the source of much zaniness. His schemes, always wacky, often verging on absurd, work out a surprising amount of the time.
 Cube (a cube) – An archaeologist who has been involved in researching the history of their world. He is somewhat secretive and extremely skeptical of the Cartoonist and his perceived bumblings.
 Orpuddex (a ghost-shape) – The Pudding-Watcher, keeper of the Pudding Factory of the Dead, and possibly sentry of the igneous food group. Initially presented as evil and bent on the destruction of all that is not smooth pudding, he figures into the plot in increasingly complicated ways.
 Mr. Disease [a Chinese character, 病 (Literally:  sickness; Cantonese:  beng6)] – Restaurateur, cuisine magician, and sentry of the metamorphic food group. Mr. Disease trained Triangle in cuisine magic, and his advice and Chinese food are often appreciated.
 Linda Concarne (a shaded rectangle) – The meat sentry, formerly meat enforcer with the International Culinary Institute. She shouts a lot, sometimes flips out and kills people, and doesn't always get along with the other sentries.
 The Grain Sentry (an equilateral triangle, partly shaded) – The grain sentry, formerly the Food Pyramid, was on the run from the law when he was introduced, having been framed by the International Culinary Institute in an attempt to preserve the doctrine of the food groups. His name cleared by Triangle and Robert, he has joined the other sentries.
 The Vegetable Sentry (an acute isosceles triangle, point down) – The vegetable sentry was introduced in a deep, coma-like meditation from which Triangle and Robert had to awaken him in order to deal with a threat from Orpuddex.
 The Dairy Sentry (an irregular heptagon) – Originally introduced in an enchanted form as an inverted capital 'G', the dairy sentry was Triangle and Robert's pet dog prior to his disenchantment by the power of the bone of the Starham.
 The Cornersheep (a rectangular placeholder marked "Insert Super-Intelligent Telepathic Sheep") – The Cornersheep is a super-intelligent telepathic sheep and sometime arch-villain, created when Robert's attempt to rustle sheep by hotwiring them went wrong. Triangle and Robert then gave up sheep rustling in favor of wacky scheme consulting. The Cornersheep commands a herd of ordinary sheep from a headquarters in Scotland and occasionally makes trouble.
 Prozac the Bear (a prozac capsule) – Probably the weirdest character, Prozac is shunned and feared by the other characters. He is a representation of the Cartoonist's incompetence – meaning he shows up whenever the Cartoonist loses his grip on the plot of the strip, or when the characters are questioning him too much and he panics. He has no continuity (illustrated by the incident in which he becomes a small planet for no apparent reason, leading Triangle to exclaim "He's a being with no continuity. There's no reason for him NOT to be a massive dusty planetoid that we've inadvertently landed on") and usually just barely makes enough sense to be part of the plot. Towards the end of the comic, he was given an origin story in an attempt to bind him to the strip's rules.
 The MSG entity (not pictured) – An entity which emerged from the world's supply of MSG gaining consciousness. It is able to influence the plot by forming itself into shapes, such as a dome or spaceship.
 The Cartoonist (not pictured) – The Cartoonist has an ambiguous relationship with his creations but continues to draw Triangle and Robert despite criticisms from inside the strip, and sometimes despite his paint program not working properly, forcing a temporary text-only mode.
 The Beforings (not pictured) – The Beforings seem to be creators of Triangle and Robert's universe in a different sense than the Cartoonist is. They lie outside of time and appear about once a year to remark on how things are going.

Awards
Triangle and Robert won Best Minimalist Comic in the 2001 Web Cartoonist's Choice Awards.

See also
Flatland

References

External links
Triangle and Robert via The Wayback Machine

1999 webcomic debuts
2007 webcomic endings
1990s webcomics
2000s webcomics
Web Cartoonists' Choice Award winners
Metafictional comics